is a railway station on the Senseki Line in the city of  Higashimatsushima, Miyagi, Japan, operated by East Japan Railway Company (JR East). The station was closed between March 2011 and May 2015.

Lines
Rikuzen-Ōtsuka Station is served by the Senseki Line, and is located 30.8 kilometers from the terminus of the line at Aoba-dōri Station. It is also served by trains of the Senseki-Tōhoku Line.

Station layout
The station has one island platform connected to the station building (an open-sided structure containing a ticket machine) by a level crossing. The station is unattended.

Platforms

History
The line was nationalized on May 1, 1944, and the station was renamed Rikuzen-Ōtsuka at that time. The station was absorbed into the JR East network upon the privatization of JNR on April 1, 1987. The station was closed from March 11, 2011, due to damage to the line associated with the 2011 Tōhoku earthquake and tsunami, and services were replaced by a provisional bus rapid transit service. The station reopened on 30 May 2015.

Surrounding area
Miyagi Prefectural Route 27

See also
 List of railway stations in Japan

References

External links

 

Railway stations in Miyagi Prefecture
Senseki Line
Railway stations in Japan opened in 1928
Stations of East Japan Railway Company
Higashimatsushima, Miyagi